Menya (Menyama, Menye) is an Angan language of Papua New Guinea.

Classification
Menya is classified as an Angan language. Its closest relatives in terms of shared vocabulary are Kapau and Yagwoia at 69-75% and 50-58% respectively. As the Menya-speaking area is bordered on all sides by speakers of other Angan languages, much of the Menya grammar and vocabulary has remained intact and is consistent with other Angan languages. Most ethnographic evidence suggest that the Menya-speaking people do not think of themselves as culturally distinct from their neighbors, as they have no words for Menya identity and people.

Status
Menya is used by the community by all age groups, although there is a growing bilingualism and use of Tok Pisin, and to a lesser extent, English. The Menya language is now being shaped by this bilingualism as shifts in vocabulary and grammar have become apparent. Nonetheless unlike other areas of New Guinea language attitudes towards Menya remain positive and the language is not endangered.

Phonology

Consonants

Vowels

References

Languages of Morobe Province
Angan languages